Odette Barencey (20 August 1893 – 4 March 1981) was a French film actress. She appeared in more than 50 films between 1927 and 1958. She was married to the actor Marcel Barencey.

Selected filmography

 My Childish Father (1930)
 Moon Over Morocco (1931)
 Montmartre (1931)
 The Faceless Voice (1933)
 The Last of the Six (1941)
 Notre-Dame de la Mouise (1941)
 The Blue Veil (1942)
 The Stairs Without End (1943)
 Traveling Light (1944)
 A Friend Will Come Tonight (1946)
 Land Without Stars (1946)
 Les Amants du pont Saint-Jean (1947)
 Sybille's Night (1947)
 The Cupid Club (1949)
 Lady Paname (1950)
 Paris Vice Squad (1951)
 My Seal and Them (1951)
 Passion (1951)
 My Friend Oscar (1951)
 The Red Head (1952)
 The Sparrows of Paris (1953)
 Little Jacques (1953)
 Their Last Night (1953)
 Flesh and the Woman (1954)
 Madelon (1955)
 The Whole Town Accuses (1956)
 Girl and the River (1958)

References

External links

1893 births
1981 deaths
French film actresses
Actresses from Paris
20th-century French actresses